Rubes is a syndicated newspaper single-panel cartoon created by Leigh Rubin on November 1, 1984.

Publication history
Leigh Rubin began making and distributing his own greeting cards in 1979 through his company Rubes. The cartoon Rubes began appearing in newspapers in 1984 and is since January 1989 syndicated by Creators Syndicate to over 400 newspapers worldwide, and was published in paperbacks from 1988 on. It was pulled from the Brigham Young University student newspaper The Daily Universe after several complaints by readers, but seems to have attracted little controversy otherwise.

Being a popular cartoon, Rubes is also heavily merchandised, with calendars, greeting cards, mugs, and T-shirts.

Rubes hasn't won any of the major comics or cartoon awards, but has won a few minor awards like a bronze award at ForeWord magazine’s Book of the Year.

Publications

Books (collections)
 The Penguin is Mightier than the Swordfish. Fragments West / Valentine Press, 1987. 
 Rubes. Penguin Group, 1988. 
 Sharks Are People Too! Rubes Publications, 1990. 
 Calves Can Be So Cruel: The Best of Rubes Cartoons. Penguin Group, 1990. 
 Rubes Calves Can Be So Cruel. Ravette Publishing, 1992. 
 Rubes Bible Cartoons. Hendrickson Publishers, 1999. 
 Rubes Then & Now: Cartoons for the Millennium and Beyond! Image Maker Publishing, 1999. 
 The Wild Life of Dogs: A Rubes Cartoon Book. BowTie Press, 2003. 
 The Wild Life of Pets: A Rubes Cartoon Book. BowTie Press, 2003. 
 The Wild Life of Cows: A Rubes Cartoon Book. BowTie Press, 2003. 
 The Wild Life of Farm Animals: A Rubes Cartoon Book. BowTie Press, 2003. 
 The Wild Life of Cats: A Rubes Cartoon Book. Willow Creek Press, 2005. 
 The Wild Life of Love: A Rubes Cartoon Collection. Willow Creek Press, 2006. 
 The Wild and Twisted World of Rubes: A Rubes Cartoon Collection. Andrews McMeel Publishing, 2010.

Calendars
 Rubes Farm Animal Funnies Family Organizer 2006 (Wall) Calendar. Willow Creek Press, 2005. 
 Rubes Zoo in a Box 2006 Daily Box Calendar. Willow Creek Press, 2005. 
 Rubes Animal Antics Family Organizer 2007 (Wall) Calendar. Willow Creek Press, 2006. 
 Rubes Zoo in a Box 2007 Daily Box Calendar. Willow Creek Press, 2006. 
 Rubes Animal Antics Family Organizer 2008 (Wall) Calendar. Willow Creek Press, 2007. 
 Rubes Zoo in a Box 2008 Daily Box Calendar. Willow Creek Press, 2007. 
 Rubes Zoo in a Box 2009 Daily Box Calendar. Willow Creek Press, 2008. 
 Rubes Zoo in a Box 2010 Daily Box Calendar. Willow Creek Press, 2009. 
 Rubes Zoo in a Box 2011 Daily Box Calendar. Willow Creek Press, 2010. 
 Rubes 2012 (Wall) Calendar. Day Dream Publishing, 2011. 
 Rubes Zoo in a Box 2012 Daily Box Calendar. Mead, 2011. 
 Rubes Zoo in a Box 2013 Daily Box Calendar. Mead, 2012.

Mega Mini Kits
 Rubes Cow Tipping: You Can't Keep a Good Cow Down! Running Press, 2011.

Notes

External links
Official website
Rubes page on the Creators Syndicate website
Animated Rubes e-cards on Doozy Cards
Animated Rubes e-cards on HD greetings

American comic strips
Gag cartoon comics
1984 comics debuts